The discography of G.R.L. consists of one extended play, three singles, one featured single, one promotional single, four music videos and other album appearances. Beginning in 2013, G.R.L. began recording songs for their debut album. Their first promotional single, "Vacation" was released on June 18, 2013. In 2014, they were the featured artist on the single "Wild Wild Love", by American rapper Pitbull.

On June 3, 2013, G.R.L. released their first official single "Ugly Heart", which served as the first single from their EP G.R.L., released on July 29, 2014. The EP also features three previously unheard tracks: "Rewind", "Don't Talk About Love", and "Girls Are Always Right". The EP also includes the promotional single, "Show Me What You Got". In August 2014, "Ugly Heart" peaked at number 2 on the ARIA Charts and number 3 on the Official New Zealand Music Chart, as well as other chart appearances too.

On September 5, 2014, Battle was found dead in her West Hollywood home. Los Angeles County Coroner's Lieutenant Fred Corral ruled the death a suicide, following an autopsy. After releasing a preview of the song in December, "Lighthouse" was confirmed as the group's next promotional single in January 2015, the first since Battle's death. The single cover was released on January 13, with the music video following two days later, on January 15. "Lighthouse" peaked at number 18 in New Zealand, and number 30 in Australia.

Extended plays

Singles

As lead artists

As featured artists

Promotional singles

Music videos

Notes

References

Pop music group discographies